Rathnew is a village in County Wicklow, Ireland.

Education
Rathnew is home to Gaelscoil Chill Mhantáin, an Irish language primary school, which was established in 1996. The school was Ireland's first inter-denominational primary school, and draws pupils from Rathdrum, Brittas and Newcastle, as well as Rathnew.

Rathnew is also home to St Coen's National School, a co-educational national (primary) school which was formed following the amalgamation of a number of former/smaller schools in the area. As of 2019, it had over 270 pupils enrolled.

The local secondary school is Coláiste Chill Mhantáin, which opened in September 2011. Coláiste Chill Mhantáin is the amalgamation of two previous secondary schools based in Wicklow Town, Abbey Community College and De La Salle.

Since late 2006 Clermont Convent, previously a private Secondary School for girls, has reopened on the same grounds as a Third Level College affiliated to the Institute of Technology, Carlow.

Sport
The village's Gaelic football team has won the Wicklow Senior Provincial Championship more than 30 times, most recently in 2017.

Rathnew's soccer club was founded in 1958. For a time there the village had two soccer teams, Rathnew Ernans and Rathnew Celtic. Rathnew Celtic was only team to ever go through the Leinster Junior Cup without conceding a goal in 1978/1979 season. In 1986 both teams joined to make Rathnew A.F.C. a team which is still present today The club is based in Shamrock Park. Since late 2010, Rathnew A.F.C. has also played host to Rathnew Ladies A.F.C. soccer side, the first women's team in the history of the club, and which won the DWSL Shield in 2011.

Tourism

Rathnew is home to the historic Tinakilly House, the former residence of Capt. Robert Halpin and now a hotel. It is situated in the center of the village opposite the local cemetery with narrow entrance to a mile-long avenue. The building was first built in 1883 when it became Halpin's residence. The house overlooks the Irish Sea with a large gardens surrounding it.

Transport
Rathnew railway station opened on 1 September 1866, closed for goods traffic on 9 June 1947, and finally closed on 30 March 1964. For rail transport today, the closest station is Wicklow railway station, two miles inwards. 

The local bus goes through the village every hour and stops outside the local primary school.

Economy
Rathnew is home to three pubs: The Rathnew House, Fitzpatricks, and Shay Doyle's. Rathnew is also home to two chip shops as well as three shops one of which is also a petrol station. Rathnew held three sawmills two of which are still operational: Duffy's and Jameson's. M.D. & Sons industrial steel manufacturers is another local company.

The local postoffice is located at Merrymeeting Shopping Centre.

Community Space 

 Rathnew Women's Shed
 Rathnew Men's Shed

Famous people associated with Rathnew 
 Francis Chomley (1822-1892) - businessman.
 Tom Cullen (1891-1926) Irish republican.
 Johnny Doran (1908-1950) - uilleann piper.
 Susyn M. Andrews (b. 1953) - horticulturist.
 Patricia O'Brien (b. 1957) - diplomat.
 Leighton Glynn (b. 1982) - Gaelic footballer.

See also
 List of towns and villages in Ireland

References

External links

 Rathnew at Wicklow County Tourism
 Rathnew GAA Club

Towns and villages in County Wicklow